Jorge Daniel Pardo (born September 7, 1980) is an American actor. He is best known for playing Jack Toretto in F9 (2021), as well as the lead role of Ezekiel "EZ" Reyes in the television series Mayans M.C. (2018–present).

Early life
Pardo was born in Los Angeles, California, his father is from Argentina and his mother from El Salvador.

Career
Pardo has played Ezekiel "EZ" Reyes in FX's Mayans M.C. since the show premiered

Pardo also played "Nate"/Jason in the NBC sci-fi series Revolution, co-starring Billy Burke. Previously he was best known for his role as Edward Araujo Jr./Gwen Amber Rose Araujo in the Lifetime Network movie called A Girl Like Me: The Gwen Araujo Story.
Pardo also had roles on FOX's Drive and The CW's Hidden Palms. Both series were cancelled after their respective first seasons. Pardo played Young Santiago in the film The Burning Plain (2008) starring opposite Jennifer Lawrence with Charlize Theron and Kim Basinger. He played the half-vampire Nahuel in the second half of Breaking Dawn, and a member of a drug cartel in Snitch.  Pardo also starred in The CW TV series The Messengers that aired during the 2014–2015 season.

Personal life
Despite growing up in Los Angeles, where there is a large Las Vegas Raiders following (the team spent 13 seasons in Los Angeles among 60 seasons in California), Pardo is a fan of the Kansas City Chiefs.

Filmography

Film

Television

Awards
2007: Nominated for an Imagen Award for Best Actor - Television for: A Girl Like Me: The Gwen Araujo Story (2006) (TV)

2019: Nominated for an Imagen Award for Best Actor - Television for: Mayans M.C. (FX Networks; 20th Television and FX Productions)

2020: Nominated for an Imagen Award for Best Actor - Television for: Mayans M.C. (FX Networks; 20th Television and FX Productions)

2021: Won an Imagen Award for Best Actor – Television (Drama): JD Pardo, Mayans M.C. (FX Networks; 20th Television and FX Productions)

References

External links

J. D. Pardo at Instagram

1980 births
American people of Argentine descent
American people of Salvadoran descent
Male models from California
American male film actors
American male television actors
Hispanic and Latino American actors
Living people
People from Panorama City, Los Angeles